Buenos Aires Police may refer to:

Police Agencies
Buenos Aires Provincial Police (Serving Buenos Aires Province).
Buenos Aires City Police (Serving the Autonomous City of Buenos Aires).
Buenos Aires Metropolitan Police (Old police department of the Autonomous City of Buenos Aires).